Cerro Pedernal, locally known as just "Pedernal", is a narrow mesa in northern New Mexico. The name is Spanish for "flint hill". The mesa lies on the north flank of the Jemez Mountains, south of Abiquiu Lake, in the Coyote Ranger District of the Santa Fe National Forest. Its caprock was produced in the Jemez Volcanic Field.

Pedernal is the source of a chert used by the prehistoric Gallina people. Its cliffs are popular with rock climbers.  Georgia O'Keeffe made many paintings of it, and her ashes were scattered on its top.

References

External links

Cerro Pedernal review with photos. Climb.Mountains.com.
Cerro Pedernal. New Mexico Bureau of Geology and Mineral Resources.
 

Jemez Mountains
Landforms of Rio Arriba County, New Mexico
Mesas of New Mexico
Tourist attractions in Rio Arriba County, New Mexico
Climbing areas of New Mexico